The Ultra Low Floor tram (ULF) is a low-floor tram operating in Vienna, Austria, and Oradea, Romania, built by a consortium composed of Siemens and ELIN in Vienna. It has the lowest floor-height of any such vehicle.

Overview 

This configuration required a new undercarriage. The axles had to be replaced by a complex electronic steering of the traction motors. Auxiliary devices are installed largely under the car's roof.

The ULF technology went into testing in the early 1990s. Since 1998, ULFs have been in use on Vienna's tram network. As of mid-2008, 302 cars were in operation (150 cars since mid-2006, and another 152 as of 2007).

Siemens ULF trams were introduced in Oradea, Romania, on 24 April 2008, and are the only ULF trams outside Austria.

Technical specifications

Gallery

See also 
 Trams in Vienna
 Trams in Oradea

References

External links 

 Railway Gazette
 Siemens ULF technical overview
  Ulf story
  Unofficial website about Ulf

Tram vehicles of Austria
Siemens tram vehicles
Tram vehicles of Romania